Feralia deceptiva, the deceptive sallow, is a species of mossy sallow in the moth family Noctuidae. It is found in North America.

The MONA or Hodges number for Feralia deceptiva is 10006.

References

Further reading

 
 
 

Amphipyrinae
Articles created by Qbugbot
Moths described in 1920